The Garrett Coliseum is a 12,500-seat multi-purpose arena in Montgomery, Alabama, United States.  The arena is the centerpiece of the Alabama Agricultural Center, home to the Alabama National Fair. It was built in 1951 and named after W. W. Garrett, the first chairman of the Alabama Agricultural Board.  The coliseum's first event was a concert by Hank Williams.  In 2005 and 2006, it was home to the Montgomery Maulers of the National Indoor Football League.  The arena contains 8,500 permanent seats and can seat up to 10,500 for end-stage shows, 12,500 for boxing, wrestling and center-stage concerts.  
The Garrett Coliseum Complex is also  home to the official state horse show, by Law on the books the Alabama Open Horsemans Association State Championship Horse Show, which is held every year on Labor Day Weekend.

Garrett Coliseum is unique among indoor arenas for its bandstand which is located at the coliseum's stage end.  The Coliseum also contains a 33,600-square-foot arena floor.  Adjacent venues in the Alabama National Fairgrounds include the Crawford Arena with 26,243 square feet of space; Teague Arena with 7800 square feet of space; a 14,400-square-foot Exhibit Building, and the 10,500-square-foot Homer Lewis Building.

References

External links

Official website

Sports venues completed in 1951
Sports venues in Montgomery, Alabama
Indoor arenas in Alabama
1951 establishments in Alabama